Jibril is an Arabic variant of Gabriel, and a common Arabic given name and surname.

Jibril may refer to:

Given name
Jibril Rajoub (born 1953), also known by his kunya Abu Rami, Palestinian political and militant figure
Jibril Yakubu, Administrator of Zamfara State after it was created from part of Sokoto State in October 1996
 Jibril, a character from the No Game No Life series

Middle name
Abdul Rahman Ahmed Jibril Baroud (1937–2010), Palestinian poet
Cameron Jibril Thomaz (born 1987), better known by the stage name Wiz Khalifa, American rapper

Surname
Ahmed Jibril (1938–2021), founder and leader of the Popular Front for the Liberation of Palestine – General Command
Jihad Ahmed Jibril (1961–2002), leader of the military wing of the Popular Front for the Liberation of Palestine – General Command
Mahmoud Jibril (1952–2020), Prime Minister of Libya for seven and a half months during the Libyan Civil War
Mas’ud El-Jibril, Nigerian Senator and politician
Mohammed Kabiru Jibril (born 1958), Nigerian senator and politician

Other uses
Jibril (film), a 2018 film

See also
Jubril (disambiguation)
Gabriel (disambiguation)
Gibril (disambiguation)
Djibril (disambiguation)
Jibril Agreement (May 21, 1985), a prisoner exchange between the Israeli government and the Popular Front for the Liberation of Palestine - General Command

Surnames from given names